Maulana Yusuf (also spelled Molana Yusup) was the second sultan of Banten, and reigned from c. 1570 to 1580.

About 1579, he conquered Pajajaran, which was the last significant Hindu-Buddhist kingdom on Java. With this conquest, the Sundanese elite are said to have embraced Islam.

Notes

Sultans of Banten